Eintracht Frankfurt started the 2007–08 season competing in the Bundesliga and the DFB-Pokal.

Players

First-team squad
Squad at end of season

Left club during season

Eintracht Frankfurt II

Transfers

In:

Out:

Results
Results for Eintracht Frankfurt for season 2007–08.

'''NOTE: scores are written Eintracht first

Key:
BL = Bundesliga
GC = German Cup (DFB-Pokal)
F = Friendly match
IT = Indoor tournament

Notes

Sources

 

 Official English Eintracht website 
 Eintracht-Archiv.de
 2007–08 Eintracht Frankfurt season at Fussballdaten.de 

Eintracht Frankfurt seasons
Eintracht Frankfurt